Re Dolphin’s Conveyance [1970] Ch 654 is an English land law case, concerning covenants. The general legal requirement for a building scheme to exist to enable constrain certain types of development on adjoining land was on the facts satisfied as the multiple vendors were in fact common beneficiaries selling on identical legal terms and no drawing of a cogent estate plan was here necessary.

Facts
Robert Dolphin, owner of Selly Hill Estate, Birmingham, died and the plots were sold in nine conveyances. The first four by his sisters, the last five by his nephew, all on the same legal terms, with covenants about the house type to be built on each plot. These sellers covenanted they would impose similar covenants on the other sale of plots. The current owner, a subsequent owner of one of the houses, wished to redevelop in breach of covenants and asked the Court whether they were enforceable.

Judgment
Stamp J held that even though there was no common vendor and the estate had not been laid out prior to sale, there was a building scheme created.

Cases cited

Applied
Baxter v Four Oaks Properties Ltd [1965] Ch 816; [1965] 2 WLR 1115; [1965] 1 All ER 906, Ch D

Distinguished
White v Bijou Mansions Ltd [1938] Ch 351, CAElliston v Reacher [1908] 2 Ch 665, CA

See also

English land law
English trusts law
English property lawWrotham Park Estate Co Ltd v Parkside Homes Ltd''

Notes

English land case law
High Court of Justice cases
1970 in case law
1970 in British law